The navel is a scar on the abdomen caused when the umbilical cord is removed from a newborn baby.

Navel may also refer to:
 Beef navel, the ventral part of the plate
Navel (company), a Japanese software publisher
Navel orange, a seedless strain of oranges
Navel (album)
NAVEL, a mnemonic for surgeons

See also
Fuzzy navel
Navel in human culture
Navel of the World (disambiguation)
Navel of the Earth (disambiguation)
Naval, referring to a navy
Belly button (disambiguation)